Hercynite is a spinel mineral with the formula FeAl2O4.

It occurs in high-grade metamorphosed iron rich argillaceous sediments as well as in mafic and ultramafic igneous rocks. Due to its hardness it also is found in placers.

It was first described in 1847 and its name originates from the Latin name for the Harz, Silva Hercynia, where the species was first found.

Hercynite is a spinel of regular symmetry and  normal cation distribution, but some disorder occurs in its structure. It consists of ferrous (Fe2+) ions and aluminium ions (Al3+), however some ferric ions (Fe3+) may be located in the structure of hercynite.

Melting point of this mineral is inbetween .

References

Iron minerals
Aluminium minerals
Spinel group
Cubic minerals
Minerals in space group 227